Richard George Harvey (born 1 April 1969 in Letchworth) is an English former footballer.

Playing career
A product of the club's youth system, Harvey made his League debut on 1 November 1986 in a 1–0 home win over Queens Park Rangers. He eventually became a regular in the Luton side, but due to bad luck with injuries he missed the best part of three years. Apart from a short loan spell at Blackpool in 1992, he stayed with Luton until 1998, when he left to join Aylesbury United. He also balanced his Luton career with the England Under 21s side, where he made appearances with the team in Rio de Janeiro's Maracanã stadium, Berlin's Olympic Stadium and London's Wembley Stadium.

Post-career
Harvey is now a postman in his home town of Letchworth.

References

External links

1969 births
Living people
English Football League players
English footballers
Luton Town F.C. players
Blackpool F.C. players
Aylesbury United F.C. players
People from Letchworth
Association football defenders
Footballers from Hertfordshire